is a former Japanese football player.

Playing career
Nishi was born in Sendai on May 12, 1983. He joined newly was promoted to J1 League club, Vegalta Sendai from youth team in 2002. Although he debuted in 2003 Emperor's Cup, he could only play this match until 2003 and Vegalta was relegated to J2 League end of 2003 season. Although he played 5 matches as substitute midfielder in 2004 season, he could not play many matches. In 2005, he moved to Regional Leagues club Grulla Morioka. He played many matches in 2 seasons. In 2007, he moved to Japan Football League club Sony Sendai. He played all 34 matches in 2007 season. However he could not play many matches in 2008 season. In 2009, he re-joined Grulla for the first time in 3 years. He played as regular player in 3 seasons until 2011. He retired end of 2011 season.

Club statistics

References

External links

footballjapan.jp 

1983 births
Living people
Association football people from Miyagi Prefecture
Japanese footballers
J1 League players
J2 League players
Japan Football League players
Vegalta Sendai players
Iwate Grulla Morioka players
Sony Sendai FC players
Association football midfielders